Dzirive is a settlement in Kenya's Kwale County.

References 

Populated places in Coast Province
Kwale County